Howard Butterworth (born June 1945) is a Scottish landscape artist working in the North East of Scotland.

Butterworth moved to Aberdeenshire from Yorkshire, England in the 1960s.

In 2006 he created fifteen oil paintings of the River Dee, Aberdeenshire, which were sold for up to £13,000 each, with 30% of the proceeds donated to the River Dee Trust. Queen Elizabeth II purchased one of the paintings.

He has an art gallery, run by his daughter, located between Banchory and Aboyne.

References

 "Artist gives design student valued advice", The Press and Journal, 1 November 2010
 Galleries.co.uk

External links
 
 Butterworth Gallery from visitscotland.com

Living people
Scottish artists
1945 births